KKs 3 is a dwarf galaxy in the Local Group. It is unusual because it is gas poor and very isolated in the halo of the local group. KKs 3 is 7 million light years away from Earth. It is categorised as a dwarf spheroidal dSph galaxy. The mass of KKs 3 is 2.3 × 107 (23 million times the mass of the Sun) with a blue absolute magnitude of −10.8. Three-quarters of its stars are over 12 billion years old. Coordinates are R.A. = 02h 24m 44.4s, Dec. = −73°30′51".

It was discovered in December 2014 as a result of the image taken in August by the Hubble telescope.

References

Dwarf spheroidal galaxies
Hydrus (constellation)
Local Group
20141222